The Noupoort Wind Energy Facility is a wind farm in the Umsobomvu Local Municipality, built 10 km east of Noupoort in the Northern Cape province of South Africa. 

Construction commenced May 2015. Delivery of turbines commenced April 2016. Construction was completed mid-2016. It has the capacity to provide power for 91 835 South African homes.

References

Wind farms in South Africa
Economy of the Northern Cape
Pixley ka Seme District Municipality